Christian Heyden (baptised 14 August 1803, died 4 November 1869) was a German architect. He is known for Gothic Revival buildings, especially churches, in Westphalia, Germany.

Career 
Heyden was the son of the Baumeister Johann Christian Heyden the elder. He was baptised on 14 August 1803 in Freckhausen. Heyden was from 1843 member of the board of the Barmer section of the Central Cathedral Building Society. He was a member of the Elberfeld Masonic lodge Hermann zum Lande der Berge and in 1863 was awarded the Prussian Order of the Red Eagle.

Heyden has been regarded as a leading figure for Gothic Revival buildings in Westphalia. Heyden has been regarded as a leading figure for Gothic Revival buildings in Westphalia.

Heyden took part in buildings of Gasanstalten, including Barmen, Gütersloh and Dorsten.

Gallery

References

External links 

 
 Heyden-Arbeit hat sich gelohnt - Christian-Heyden-Preis für Baukultur 2017 vergeben auf der Gütersloh

19th-century German architects
1803 births
1869 deaths
People from Oberbergischer Kreis